Jalan Gelung Pepuyu (Perak state route A127) is a major road in Perak, Malaysia.

List of junctions

Changkat Keruing